Glyphidocera dominicella is a moth in the family Autostichidae. It was described by Walsingham in 1897. It is found in the West Indies, where it has been recorded from Dominica.

The wingspan is about 15 mm. The forewings are fawn-grey, sparsely sprinkled with olive-brown and with two olive-brown spots on the disc, one at its outer extremity, the other halfway between this and the base. The hindwings are brownish olivaceous.

References

Moths described in 1897
Glyphidocerinae